This article contains the list of Chairmen of the Federation Council of Russia.

Since the office was created in 1994, 5 individuals, from 4 of the 85 federal subjects, have served as Chairman of the Federation Council. The numbers from each federal subjects are:
One: Kaliningrad Oblast, Oryol Oblast and Mari El Republic
Two: Saint Petersburg

Despite the fact that on the Federation Council officially there is no division along party lines, the three Chairman were members of political parties.
One: Russian Party of Life and A Just Russia
Two: United Russia
Three: Independent

The current Chairman is Valentina Matviyenko took office in 2011, becoming the first woman Chairman of the Federation Council.

List

Chairmen by time in office

References

Russia, Federation Council
Federation Council, Chairmen